

The UBV photometric system (from Ultraviolet, Blue, Visual), also called the Johnson system (or Johnson-Morgan system), is a photometric system usually employed for classifying stars according to their colors. 
It was the first standardized  photometric system. The apparent magnitudes of stars in the system are often used to determine the color indices B−V and U−B, the difference between the B and V magnitudes and the U and B magnitudes respectively. 

The choice of colors on the blue end of the spectrum was assisted by the bias that photographic film has for those colors. It was introduced in the 1950s by American astronomers Harold Lester Johnson and William Wilson Morgan. A  telescope and the  telescope at McDonald Observatory were used to define the system.

These stars correspond with a mean effective temperature (Teff (K)) of between 9727 and 9790 Kelvin, the latter being stars with class A0V (V meaning five).

The system has a key limit drawback. The short wavelength cutoff that is the shortest limit of the U filter is set by any given terrestrial atmosphere rather than the filter itself; thus, it (and observed magnitudes) varies chiefly with altitude and atmospheric water (humidity plus condensation into clouds). However, many measurements have been made in this system, including thousands of the bright stars.

Extensions
The Johnson-Cousins UBVRI photometric system is a common extension of Johnson's original system that provides redder passbands.

See also 
Strömgren photometric system

Notes

References 

Photometric systems
American inventions
Stellar astronomy